William Jackson Worthington (November 9, 1833 – May 22, 1914) served in the Union Army during the American Civil War, was a state senator, and served as the 26th Lieutenant Governor of Kentucky under Governor William O. Bradley from 1895 to 1899. He was born in Pennsylvania and died in Boyd County, Kentucky.

Early life
Worthington was born near Johnstown, Pennsylvania, but spent his childhood in Ohio. He came to Kentucky with his parents as a teenager, and served in the 22nd Kentucky Infantry Regiment of the Union Army during the American Civil War. He was commissioned captain of the Company B of the regiment, and was later promoted to the ranks of major and lieutenant colonel. Worthington was present during the Siege of Vicksburg and the Battle of Cumberland Gap. He was under the command of Ambrose Burnside during the Red River Campaign and at the Capture of New Orleans.

After the conflict's end, Colonel Worthington returned to his home in Greenup County, Kentucky and purchased a furnace in the Hanging Rock Iron Field. He was actively involved in the iron business for about fifteen years.

Career
Worthington was prominent and influential in local affairs during his lifetime. He served one term as county judge of Greenup, Kentucky and was elected a state senator in 1869. In 1895 he was elected lieutenant governor of the state, and in 1900 he was again elected to the State Legislature. Worthington pardoned one of the axe murderers involved in a horrific attack on a family of African Americans (Blyew v. United States).

Legacy
The city of Worthington, Kentucky was named after Worthington, being built by his daughters upon land inherited from the Colonel.

References

1833 births
1914 deaths
Lieutenant Governors of Kentucky
People from Cambria County, Pennsylvania
Kentucky Republicans
19th-century American politicians
Union Army officers
Military personnel from Pennsylvania